The Municipality of Hodoš is a municipality in Slovenia. The seat of the municipality is the village of Hodoš. It is part of the Prekmurje region. Both Slovene and Hungarian are official languages in the municipality. The municipality was established on 7 August 1998, when it was separated from the former Municipality of Hodoš–Šalovci.

Hodoš is one of the two municipalities in Slovenia where ethnic Slovenes are a minority; the other is Dobrovnik. The majority of the population is Lutheran.

Settlements
In addition to the municipal seat of Hodoš, the municipality also includes the settlement of Krplivnik.

Demographics
Population by native language, 2002 census
Hungarian:  190 (53.37%)
Slovene:      144 (40.45%)
Others and Unknown:                 22 (6.18%)
Total:                             356

References

External links

Municipality of Hodoš on Geopedia
Hodoš municipal site

 
1998 establishments in Slovenia
Hodoš